Orchestral Manoeuvres in the Dark (OMD) are an English electronic band formed in Wirral, Merseyside, in 1978. The group consists of co-founders Andy McCluskey (vocals, bass guitar) and Paul Humphreys (keyboards, vocals), along with Martin Cooper (keyboards, saxophone) and Stuart Kershaw (drums); McCluskey has been the only constant member. Regarded as pioneers of electronic music, OMD combined an experimental, minimalist ethos with pop sensibilities, becoming key figures in the late-1970s/early-1980s emergence of synth-pop. The band were also one of the original acts involved in the MTV-driven Second British Invasion of the US.

McCluskey and Humphreys led precursor group the Id from 1977–1978, and re-recorded their track "Electricity" as OMD's debut single in 1979. Weathering an "uncool" image and a degree of hostility from music critics, the band achieved popularity throughout Europe with the 1980 anti-war song "Enola Gay", and gained further recognition via Architecture & Morality (1981) and its three hit singles. Although later reappraised, Dazzle Ships (1983) was seen as overly experimental, and eroded European support. The group embraced a more radio-friendly sound on Junk Culture (1984); this change in direction led to greater success in the United States, and spawned hits including "If You Leave" (from the 1986 film Pretty in Pink).

In 1989, creative differences saw Humphreys and other members form the spin-off band the Listening Pool, leaving McCluskey the only remaining member of OMD. The group returned with a new line-up and explored the dance-pop genre: Sugar Tax (1991) and its initial singles were hits in Europe. OMD then began to flounder amid the guitar-oriented grunge and Britpop movements, eventually disbanding in 1996. McCluskey later conceived girl group Atomic Kitten, for whom he served as a principal songwriter and producer, while Humphreys formed the duo Onetwo alongside lead vocalist Claudia Brücken of Propaganda.

In 2006, OMD reformed with Humphreys and McCluskey revisiting the experimental territory of their early work; the band have achieved 13 top-20 entries on the UK Albums Chart. Their 20th century output yielded 18 top-40 appearances on the UK Singles Chart, as well as four top-40 entries on the US Billboard Hot 100. Although sometimes identified as a cult band, OMD have sold over 40 million records worldwide, and have influenced the work of many other recording artists.

History

1975–1979: Roots and early years

Co-founders Andy McCluskey and Paul Humphreys met at primary school in Meols in the early 1960s, and in the mid-1970s, as teenagers, they were involved in different local groups but shared a distaste for guitar-driven rock with a macho attitude popular among their friends at the time. By 1975, McCluskey had formed Equinox as bassist and lead vocalist, alongside schoolmate Malcolm Holmes on drums, while Humphreys was roadie. During that time, McCluskey and Humphreys discovered their electronic style, inspired by German band Kraftwerk. After Equinox, McCluskey joined Pegasus, and, later, the short-lived Hitlerz Underpantz, alongside Humphreys. McCluskey would usually sing and play bass guitar; roadie and electronics enthusiast Humphreys, who shared McCluskey's love of electronic music, graduated to keyboards.

In September 1977, McCluskey and Humphreys put together the seven-piece (three vocalists, two guitarists, bassist, drummer, and keyboardist) Wirral band the Id, whose line-up included drummer Malcolm Holmes and McCluskey's girlfriend Julia Kneale on vocals. The group began to gig regularly in the Merseyside area, performing original material (largely written by McCluskey and Humphreys). They had quite a following on the scene, and one of their tracks ("Julia's Song") was included on a compilation album of local bands called Street to Street – A Liverpool Album (1979). Meanwhile, Humphreys and McCluskey collaborated on a side project called VCL XI, whose name was adapted from a diagram on the back cover of Kraftwerk's fifth studio album Radio-Activity (1975), reading "VCL 11". This project allowed them to pursue their more obscure electronic experiments.

In August 1978, the Id broke up due to musical differences. The same month, McCluskey joined Wirral electronic outfit Dalek I Love You as lead vocalist, but quit in September. Later that month, he rejoined Humphreys and their VCL XI project was renamed Orchestral Manoeuvres in the Dark. The name was gleaned from a list of song lyrics and ideas that were written on McCluskey's bedroom wall; and was chosen so they would not be mistaken for a punk band. Given that OMD intended to play only one gig, the duo considered their moniker to be inconsequential. McCluskey has since expressed regret over choosing "such a very silly name". The contrasting personalities of Humphreys and McCluskey established the band's dynamic, with the former saying that "two Pauls wouldn't get anything done and two Andys would kill each other." They have further described their creative roles as "The Surgeon" (Humphreys) and "The Butcher" (McCluskey). As working class youngsters, OMD had a limited budget, using second-hand "junk-shop" instruments including a left-handed bass guitar (which McCluskey would play upside-down). The pair also created their own devices, with Humphreys "making things out of his aunt's radios cannibalised for the circuit boards". Eventually, they acquired a basic Korg M-500 Micro Preset synthesizer, purchased via McCluskey's mother's mail-order catalogue for £7.76 a week, paid over 36 weeks.

OMD began to gig regularly as a duo, performing to backing tracks played from a TEAC 4-track tape-recorder christened "Winston" (after the antihero of George Orwell's novel Nineteen Eighty-Four). Their debut performance was in October 1978 at Eric's Club in Liverpool. Finding themselves on the cusp of an electronic new wave in British pop music, they released a one-off single, "Electricity", with independent label Factory Records. The track was supposed to be produced by the Factory Records producer Martin Hannett. However, the A-side was the band's original demo produced by their friend, owner of Winston and soon to be manager, Paul Collister, under the pseudonym Chester Valentino (taken from a nightclub called Valentino's in the nearby city of Chester). The single's sleeve was designed by Peter Saville, whose distinctive graphics contributed to OMD's public image into the 1980s. The success of "Electricity" led to the band receiving a seven-album recording contract with Dindisc, worth over £250,000.

In 1979, they were asked to support Gary Numan on his first major British tour. Humphreys noted, "[Numan] gave us our first big break. He saw us opening for Joy Division and he asked us to go on tour with him... we went from the small clubs to playing huge arenas. Gary was very good to us." Numan later supported OMD on a 1993 UK arena tour.

1980–1988: Classic line-up

Rather than hire studio time to record their eponymous debut album (1980), McCluskey and Humphreys used their advance payment from Dindisc to build their own Liverpool recording studio, called the Gramophone Suite. They predicted that they would be dropped by the label due to disappointing sales, but would at least own a studio. The album showcased the band's live set at the time, and included some guest drums from former Id drummer Malcolm Holmes and saxophone from former Dalek I Love You member Martin Cooper. It had a raw, poppy, melodic synth-pop sound. Dindisc arranged for the song "Messages" to be re-recorded (produced by Gong bassist Mike Howlett) and released as a single – it gave the band their first hit. Dave Hughes (another Dalek I Love You alumnus), who joined OMD in 1980, is featured in the "Messages" music video. A tour followed; Winston was augmented with live drums from Malcolm Holmes, and Dave Hughes played synthesizers. Hughes left OMD in late 1980.

The band's second studio album, Organisation (a reference to the band which preceded Kraftwerk, founded by Kraftwerk's original members Florian Schneider-Esleben and Ralf Hütter), followed later that year, recorded as a three-piece with Humphreys, McCluskey and Holmes. It was again produced by Howlett, and had a darker, moodier feel largely inspired by the passing of Joy Division lead vocalist and former Factory label-mate, Ian Curtis. The album included the anti-war hit single "Enola Gay", named after the plane that dropped an atomic bomb on Hiroshima. The song was intended to be included on the debut studio album, but was left out at the final selection. The tour for this album had a four-piece band line-up, with Martin Cooper recruited for keyboard duties and enlisted as an official group member. The McCluskey/Humphreys/Cooper/Holmes unit came to be regarded as the band's classic line-up. In early 1981, readers of Record Mirror voted OMD the fourth-best band and eighth-best live act of 1980; NME and Sounds readers named the group the eighth and 10th best new act of the year, respectively. In Smash Hits, they were voted both the fifth-best band of 1980 and the eighth-hottest new act for 1981.

Howlett then presided over the recording of a further hit single, "Souvenir", co-written by Cooper and Humphreys. It ushered in a lush choral electronic sound. The song also became OMD's biggest UK hit to date. The band's third studio album, Architecture & Morality, was released in the UK and Europe in November 1981, becoming their most commercially successful studio album. The group went into the studio with Richard Manwaring producing. Cooper then temporarily dropped out and was replaced by Mike Douglas, but this change was reversed by the time the album was released and a tour followed. The album's sound saw OMD's original synth-pop sound augmented by the use of the Mellotron (an instrument previously associated with progressive rock bands), adding atmospheric swatches of string, choir, and other sounds to their palette. Two more hit singles, "Joan of Arc" and "Maid of Orleans" (which became the biggest-selling single of 1982 in Germany) were on the album. Both songs were originally titled "Joan of Arc"; the name of the latter single was changed to Maid of Orleans (The Waltz Joan of Arc) at the insistence of the publishers and to avoid confusion. Readers of Smash Hits voted OMD the seventh-best group of 1981, while Record Mirror readers named them the eighth-best band (as well as the 10th-best "new artist") and the third-best live act of the year. The group came close to breaking up in 1982, with McCluskey later saying, "We had never expected the success, we were exhausted."

In 1983, the band lost commercial momentum somewhat, with the release of their more experimental fourth studio album Dazzle Ships, produced by Rhett Davies, perhaps best known for his previous work with Roxy Music and Brian Eno. The record mixed melancholy synth ballads and uptempo synth-pop with musique concrète and short wave radio tape collages. Its relative commercial failure caused a crisis of confidence for Humphreys and McCluskey, and brought about a deliberate move towards the mainstream. Their following studio album, 1984's Junk Culture, was a shift to a more pop-style sound, and the band used digital sampling keyboards such as the Fairlight CMI and the E-mu Emulator. The album was a success, reassuring the group about their new direction. The "Locomotion" single returned the group to the top five in the UK and was an indicator of the group's newfound sound, notably the adoption of a classic verse–chorus form, which is something the group had often previously avoided. Record Mirror readers named OMD the eighth-best live act of 1984. In 1985, the band expanded to a sextet with the addition of brothers Graham Weir (guitar, keyboards, trombone) and Neil Weir (keyboards, trumpet, bass guitar), and released their sixth studio album, Crush, produced by Stephen Hague in Paris and New York. The success of the single "So in Love" in the US Billboard Hot 100 also led to some success for the album, which entered the American Top 40 and established the group in the US. During this period, the band also recorded a version of "So in Love" in duet with the French pop singer Étienne Daho.

Later in 1985 ,the band were asked to write a song for the John Hughes film Pretty in Pink. They offered "Goddess of Love", although the ending of the film was re-shot due to a negative response from test audiences. OMD then wrote "If You Leave" in less than 24 hours, and it became a top 5 hit in the US, Canada, and New Zealand in 1986. In September of that same year, the same six piece line-up also released their seventh studio album, The Pacific Age, but the band began to see their critical and public popularity wane notably in the UK. The album's first single, "(Forever) Live and Die", was a top 10 hit across Europe and entered the top 20 in both the UK and US. Journalist Hugo Lindgren argued that the success of "If You Leave" has concealed from US audiences the band's history of making innovative music.

On 18 June 1988, OMD supported Depeche Mode at the Rose Bowl in Pasadena, California where they played to over 60,000 people. They also released the top 20 US hit "Dreaming" and a successful greatest hits album, The Best of OMD. Graham and Neil Weir left the band at the end of the 1988 US tour.

1989–1996: McCluskey-led OMD and disbandment

As OMD appeared poised to consolidate their US success, the band continued to fracture. Humphreys departed in 1989 amid personal and creative dissension with McCluskey. Cooper and Holmes then left OMD to join Humphreys in founding a new band called the Listening Pool. McCluskey recalled, "We were all in agreement that something was wrong. How to fix it was where we disagreed."

This left only McCluskey to carry on, essentially becoming a solo artist working under the OMD banner. McCluskey's first album from the new OMD was the dance-pop studio album Sugar Tax in May 1991, which charted at No. 3 in the UK. McCluskey recruited Liverpool musicians Raw Unlimited (Lloyd Massett, Stuart Kershaw, Nathalie Loates) as collaborators for the making of Sugar Tax; writing credits carefully distinguished between songs written by OMD (i.e., McCluskey) and songs written by OMD/Kershaw/Massett. This iteration of the group was initially successful, with hits such as "Sailing on the Seven Seas" and "Pandora's Box", with lesser success on fellow chart entries "Call My Name" and "Then You Turn Away". McCluskey's live band was then composed of Nigel Ipinson (keyboards), Phil Coxon (keyboards), and Abe Juckes (drums) from late 1990. Smash Hits readers voted OMD the sixth-best British group of 1991.

The group's next studio album would be 1993's Liberator, which ventured further into dance territory. It peaked at No. 14 on the UK Albums Chart. The lead single "Stand Above Me" peaked at no. 21 on the UK Singles Chart, with a follow-up single, "Dream of Me", charting at no. 24. Paul Humphreys was credited as co-writer of the single "Everyday" (a No. 59 UK chart entry). The fifth track from Liberator, "Dream of Me", was built around a sample from "Love's Theme" by Love Unlimited Orchestra, a song written and produced by Barry White. To release the track as an OMD single, however, McCluskey had to agree that the single release would remove the actual "Love's Theme" sample, but still be officially titled "Dream of Me (Based on Love's Theme)", and furthermore would still give a writing credit to White.

Also in 1993, McCluskey made contributions to the Elektric Music album Esperanto, a project by former Kraftwerk member Karl Bartos.

McCluskey returned with a rotating cast of musicians for the more organic Universal (1996), which featured two songs co-written by Humphreys as well as a holdover from the Esperanto sessions, co-written by Bartos. The record spawned OMD's first Top 20 hit in five years, "Walking on the Milky Way".

Alhough both Liberator and Universal produced minor hits, McCluskey retired OMD in late 1996, having faced waning public interest amid the grunge and Britpop movements. A particular source of frustration was the modest commercial response to "Walking on the Milky Way", over which McCluskey said he "sweated blood", considering it "about as good a song as I could write". However, the track was not playlisted by BBC Radio 1, and Woolworths did not stock it. McCluskey said, "I just thought: 'Screw this, I'm not going to bang my head against a brick wall'." A second singles album was released in 1998, along with an EP of remixed material by such acts as Sash! and Moby.

Post-1996, McCluskey decided to focus on songwriting for such Liverpool-based acts as Atomic Kitten and Genie Queen, and trying to develop new Merseyside artists from his Motor Museum recording studio. With McCluskey focusing his talents elsewhere, Humphreys decided to work with his new musical partner Claudia Brücken (of the ZTT bands Propaganda and Act) as Onetwo. He also undertook a US live tour under the banner "Paul Humphreys from OMD".

2006–2012: Reformation and comeback

An unexpected request to perform from a German television show led the group to reunite. On 1 January 2006, McCluskey announced plans to reform OMD with the "classic" line-up of McCluskey, Humphreys, Holmes, and Cooper. The original plan was to tour the studio album Architecture & Morality and other pre-1983 material, then record a new studio album set for release in 2007. In May 2007, the Architecture & Morality remastered CD was re-released together with a DVD featuring the Drury Lane concert from 1981 that had previously been available on VHS. The band toured throughout May and June, beginning their set with a re-ordered but otherwise complete re-staging of the Architecture & Morality album. The second half of each concert featured a selection of their best known hits.

Spring 2008 saw the release of a live CD and DVD of the 2007 tour, OMD Live: Architecture & Morality & More, recorded at the Hammersmith Apollo in London. Also released was a 25th anniversary re-release of Dazzle Ships, including six bonus tracks. To tie-in with the re-release, the band made the brief "Messages 78-08 30th Anniversary Tour", featuring China Crisis as a support act. A cover of Atomic Kitten's 2001 hit, "Whole Again" (which had been co-written by McCluskey), was included on Liverpool – The Number Ones Album (2008), marking OMD's first new studio recording in 12 years.

In June 2009, an orchestral concert with the Royal Liverpool Philharmonic was played in Liverpool; a recording of this concert was released on DVD in December. The band returned to arena touring in November and December, supporting Simple Minds on their Graffiti Soul Tour. OMD had performed at the Night of the Proms festival in December 2006 in Germany, renewing the experience again in Belgium and the Netherlands that year. They were the headline act at Britain's first Vintage Computer Festival at The National Museum of Computing in June 2010. Their eleventh studio album, History of Modern, was released in September 2010, reaching No. 28 in the UK Albums Chart and being followed by a European tour. On 28 September, OMD performed as a special guest at the "first ever gig" of the Buggles.

In March 2011, OMD played their first North American tour as the original line-up since 1988. In September, the band appeared at the Electric Picnic 2011 festival in Stradbally, County Laois, Ireland. In November 2011, OMD returned to the studio and started work on their next album, English Electric. On 12 March 2012, the band played a concert in the Philippines at the Smart Araneta Coliseum in Quezon City. In August, OMD performed to South African audiences in Cape Town and Johannesburg.

2013–present: Continued acknowledgement

In 2013, OMD performed at the Coachella Valley Music and Arts Festival in Indio, California, on 14 and 21 April. "Metroland", the first single from the forthcoming studio album English Electric, was released on 25 March 2013. The album was released in the UK on 8 April, and entered the UK album chart at No. 12 and the German chart at No. 10. Reviews for both the album and their concerts were generally positive. "The Future Will Be Silent", a 500-copy limited edition 10-inch picture disc EP from English Electric, was made available for Record Store Day 2013, and included a then-exclusive non-album track titled "Time Burns". For Record Store Day 2015, a 1000-copy limited edition 10-inch EP of "Julia's Song (Dub Version)" from Junk Culture was made available, which includes an exclusive non-album track titled "10 to 1".

OMD performed a one-off concert at the Royal Albert Hall, London on 9 May 2016 to a sell-out crowd, playing both Architecture & Morality and Dazzle Ships in their entirety, along with other songs from before 1983. The only song post-1983 played was "History of Modern Part 1". The concert was recorded and made available on double CD right after the show, with a triple LP vinyl recording of the concert also being made available. The band collaborated with Gary Barlow, Taron Egerton and Hugh Jackman on the OMD song "Thrill Me", co-written by Barlow and McCluskey for the soundtrack of the 2015 film Eddie the Eagle. Work began in October 2015 on what was to be their thirteenth studio album The Punishment of Luxury, which was released on 1 September 2017. OMD toured Europe and North America in support of the album, with Stuart Kershaw replacing Holmes as the band's drummer, due to the latter's health issues.

In 2018, OMD published a book titled Pretending to See the Future, which is a first-person "autobiography" about the band. It mixed fan-submitted memories with commentary from McCluskey, Humphreys, Cooper, Holmes, and Kershaw. For people who pre-ordered the book on PledgeMusic, they received a limited-edition flexi-disc containing a previously unheard demo of "Messages" from 1978.

As part of the group's 40th-anniversary celebrations, they embarked on a UK and European tour in 2019. OMD won "Group of the Year" and "Live Act of the Year" in the 2019 Classic Pop Reader Awards. A retrospective deluxe box set titled Souvenir was also released. The 40th anniversary collection includes the band's forty singles, including a new release titled "Don't Go". It also contains 22 previously unreleased recordings from the group's archive, selected and mixed by Paul Humphreys. Two audio live shows (one from 2011 and one from 2013) are also included, together with two DVDs bringing together two more live concerts (Drury Lane in 1981 and Sheffield City Hall in 1985) plus Crush – The Movie, and various BBC TV performances from Top of the Pops, The Old Grey Whistle Test and Later... with Jools Holland. The box set was nominated for "Best Historical Album" at the 2021 Grammy Awards.

Artistry and image
James Hunter of Spin wrote that "OMD set about reinventing punk with different applications of dance beats, keyboards, melodies, and sulks", rejecting the genre's "sonic trappings but not its intellectual freedom". The band found commercial success with a style of synth-pop described as "experimental", "minimal[ist]" and "edgy". OMD often eschewed choruses, replacing them with synthesizer lines, and opted for unconventional lyrical subjects such as industrial processes, micronations and telephone boxes; the BBC said that the group "were always more intellectual" than "contemporaries like Duran Duran and Eurythmics". Despite the band's experimentation, they employed pop hooks in their music, attaining what AllMusic's Ned Raggett described as "the enviable position of at once being creative innovators and radio-friendly pop giants". They were influenced by electronic artists such as Kraftwerk, Brian Eno and Neu!, as well as more mainstream acts like David Bowie and Roxy Music. OMD drew inspiration from former Factory Records label-mates Joy Division, particularly during the making of Organisation (1980). The group also recorded two Velvet Underground covers.

OMD were indifferent to celebrity status, and avoided the calculated fashion stylings of many of their 1980s peers. During live performances, McCluskey developed a spasmodic dancing style that has been dubbed the "Trainee Teacher Dance"; he explains that it stemmed "from the perception that [OMD] were making boring robotic intellectual music that you couldn't dance to". Journalist Hugo Lindgren noted that the band were perceived as "oddballs, freaks" on the Liverpool scene, while McCluskey has identified himself and Humphreys as "synth punks" and "complete geeks". Gareth Ware of DIY called OMD "one of the guiding lights of British synth-pop... albeit one with a disarming naivety and warm characterful nature at odds with the sleek, chic image cultivated by the likes of [the] Human League and Depeche Mode." Critic Andrew Collins said the group represented a wave of "uncool" pop stars who would eventually "become cool" in the public eye.

Mid-1980s style change

The experimental Dazzle Ships (1983) was a critical and commercial disappointment upon release. Facing potential excision from Virgin Records, OMD moved toward a more accessible sound on the black music-influenced Junk Culture (1984); the band also donned more vibrant garments on the album's accompanying tour. The group continued to incorporate sonic experimentation, although their sound became increasingly polished on the Stephen Hague-produced studio albums Crush (1985) and The Pacific Age (1986).

Some journalists have rejected the group's post-Dazzle Ships reinvention, while others have expressed an appreciation for the new direction. Sean O'Neal of the A.V. Club said OMD would "give up" creatively, while the Quietus founder John Doran wrote, "It's quite popular to see OMD as nose-diving into the effluence after Dazzle Ships but the truth is there is still much to recommend." Although Junk Culture is seen to represent a shift toward a more pop-oriented style, some critics feel that the group did not relinquish their experimental ethos until 1985, the year in which they released Crush. Elements of earlier experimentation have nevertheless been observed on Crush and follow-up The Pacific Age.

Musicians have commented on OMD's mid-1980s output. Michael "Telekinesis" Lerner wrote that Junk Culture "was not something [he] could sink [his] teeth into", adding that he did not invest in the band again until after their reunion. Moby remarked, "Their earlier records were just phenomenal... a few years on they were making music for John Hughes movies, and they were good at it and I'm glad that they had success with it, but it wasn't nearly as creatively inspiring." On the other hand, bassist Tony Kanal of No Doubt said, "[OMD] inspired us to try and do our own John Hughes prom-scene movie moment kind of songs... Junk Culture is great." Angus Andrew of Liars referred to "the complexity and mastery in OMD's later pop material", calling himself "a fan of OMD albums from all of their phases".

Spin journalist Jessica Bendinger wrote in 1988, "[OMD's] music has been colored by continual exploration... which has run the gamut from Gregorian-chant-inspired anthems of love to a union of Orchestral-Motown."

Subsequent reinventions
The McCluskey-led OMD explored a dance-oriented approach on Sugar Tax (1991) and Liberator (1993); critic Ian Peel wrote that the band "defied expectations by updating their sound and becoming, if only briefly, relevant in the 90s". The group disbanded shortly after the release of Universal (1996), on which they strained for a more organic and acoustic sound. McCluskey recalled a negative media perception of the band by the mid-1990s, saying, "At the height of indie rock and Britpop, we were totally out of fashion." Since the group's 2006 reformation, their material has been seen as more akin to their early output. While celebrating the Dazzle Ships era in a 2023 article, music journalist Rob Sheffield declared that "OMD are still running at the same creative level".

Legacy and influence

OMD have been named as pioneers of electronic music, and a seminal act within the synth-pop genre; McCluskey and Humphreys have themselves been dubbed the "Lennon–McCartney of synth-pop". PopMatters described the band as "the most important and influential group of the late 1970s/early 1980s birth of electropop", while the Stranger noted they "have influenced hundreds since their early-'80s heyday". Hugo Lindgren of the New York Times wrote that the band cultivated a "legacy as musical innovators", adding, "The genre they helped invent — file under 'synth pop' — proved hugely popular." The group were one of the original acts involved in the MTV-driven Second British Invasion of the US, and are credited with helping define the sound of 1980s and early 1990s popular music. OMD are responsible for a number of landmark releases in the synth-pop canon: the singles "Electricity" (1979) and "If You Leave" (1986), and the albums Architecture & Morality (1981) and Dazzle Ships (1983), have been described as particularly influential.

OMD experienced hostility from sections of the music press, once being described in Smash Hits as "possibly the most faceless band in pop". Record Mirror told how they received a "thorough tarring of the same brush" as then-reviled artist Gary Numan, but were able to weather "this almost certain kiss of death". The Independent said, "[OMD] might not attract the kudos of Depeche Mode, Joy Division and New Order, but they were certainly as significant... The UK's answer to krautrockers Kraftwerk and Neu! were always more unusual and conceptual than they were given credit for." Philip Oakey of the Human League, another 1980s act who attained greater reverence, stated, "OMD were making better records than we were." Despite their often-difficult relationship with critics, the group have earned a loyal following; broadcaster Chris Evans remarked, "There are fans, and then there are OMD fans. [Their] fans may be among the greatest in the world... they are devout." The band also enjoys a large fanbase within the LGBT community, which McCluskey says they cherish. Architecture & Morality, regarded as OMD's seminal album, had sold over four million copies by early 2007; Sugar Tax (1991) had sold more than three million by the same time period. 1980 single "Enola Gay" has sold over five million copies. Although viewed by some journalists as a cult band, OMD have sold over 40 million records in total, with sales of 15 million albums and 25 million singles as of 2019.

Impact on other artists
Depeche Mode were influenced by OMD during their formative stages; original bandleader Vince Clarke stated that without OMD, Depeche Mode would never have existed. Clarke has further credited the group for educating mainstream audiences that electronic music could have emotion, asserting, "OMD are the guys who did that. They had a really good voice, and they created real songs. I mean, they were the songs that if you played on a guitar, if someone's singing them without synthesizers, they would say, 'Hey, that's a good song, yep, I get that'." OMD inspired other electronic contemporaries such as New Order, Tears for Fears, Erasure, Frankie Goes to Hollywood, Howard Jones, Alphaville, and Pet Shop Boys, whose vocalist, Neil Tennant, identified the band as "pioneers of electronic music". 1979 single "Electricity" was influential on a young Duran Duran, while 1980's "Messages" was a key inspiration for Kim Wilde songwriter and producer, Ricky Wilde. Rock group ZZ Top publicly championed OMD's debut studio album and adopted elements of their sound and performance style.

OMD have influenced later artists including No Doubt, the Killers, Moby, Deftones, Barenaked Ladies, MGMT, AFI, Anohni, Paul van Dyk, Sharon Van Etten, Arcade Fire orchestrator Owen Pallett, Red Hot Chili Peppers' John Frusciante, Take That's Gary Barlow, Belle and Sebastian's Stevie Jackson, and Porcupine Tree's Steven Wilson, who said the band's albums "stand up very, very well as experimental pop records with the most enjoyable kind of songwriting." 1983's "challenging" commercial flop, Dazzle Ships, has been celebrated by acts such as Saint Etienne, Death Cab for Cutie, Future Islands and producer Mark Ronson. OMD were named as childhood favourites by LCD Soundsystem's James Murphy and the Shins' James Mercer, while Sash! recognised the group as widely influential on DJ/producers and "one of the leading bands in the 80s and 90s regarding electronic music/production". The group's influence also extends to country outfit Sugarland, countertenor Andreas Scholl, and novelist Anna Smaill.

OMD's songs have been covered, remixed or sampled by acts including the Royal Philharmonic Orchestra, Boy George, Kid Cudi, Good Charlotte, Leftfield, Scooter, NOFX, Hot Chip, Nada Surf, Angel Olsen, and David Guetta, who described the opportunity to rework the band's material as "a thrill for any electronic musician". Console sampled "Sacred Heart" (1981) for his 1998 instrumental track "Crabcraft", to which Björk added vocals, retitling it "Heirloom" (2001). OMD are also the subject of two 2001 tribute albums, which feature interpretations by the likes of White Town, the Faint, Mahogany and Acid House Kings. The official biography OMD: Pretending to See the Future (2018) features tributes from fellow artists such as Kraftwerk's Karl Bartos, U2's Adam Clayton, Thompson Twins' Tom Bailey, the Teardrop Explodes' David Balfe, and Gary Numan, who credited the group for "some of the best pop songs ever written".

Band members

Current members
 Andy McCluskey – vocals, bass guitar, keyboards (1978–96; 2006–present)
 Paul Humphreys – keyboards, vocals (1978–89; 2006–present)
 Martin Cooper – keyboards, saxophone (1980–89; 2006–present)
 Stuart Kershaw – drums (1993; 2015–present)

Former members
 Malcolm Holmes – drums, percussion (1980–89; 2006–2015)
 Dave Hughes – keyboards (1979–80)
 Michael Douglas – keyboards (1980–81)
 Graham Weir – guitar, brass, keyboards (1984–89)
 Neil Weir – brass, keyboards, bass guitar (1984–89)
 Phil Coxon – keyboards (1991–93)
 Nigel Ipinson – keyboards (1991–93)
 Abe Juckes – drums (1991–92)

Timeline

Discography

Studio albums
 Orchestral Manoeuvres in the Dark (1980)
 Organisation (1980)
 Architecture & Morality (1981)
 Dazzle Ships (1983)
 Junk Culture (1984)
 Crush (1985)
 The Pacific Age (1986)
 Sugar Tax (1991)
 Liberator (1993)
 Universal (1996)
 History of Modern (2010)
 English Electric (2013)
 The Punishment of Luxury (2017)
 Bauhaus Staircase (2023)

Notes

References

Bibliography
 Houghton, Richard. OMD: Pretending to See the Future (expanded paperback). This Day in Music Books. 2019. 
 Houghton, Richard. OMD: Pretending to See the Future (hardcover). This Day in Music Books. 2018. 
 Waller, Johnny; Humphreys, Mike. Orchestral Manoeuvres in the Dark: Messages. Sidgwick & Jackson. 1987. 
 West, Mike. Orchestral Manoeuvres in the Dark. Omnibus Press. 1982.

External links

 
 Official YouTube channel
 
 
 

English electronic music groups
English new wave musical groups
English synth-pop groups
Factory Records artists
British synth-pop new wave groups
Musical groups established in 1978
Musical groups disestablished in 1996
Musical groups reestablished in 2006
Musical groups from Merseyside
Virgin Records artists
1978 establishments in England
English experimental musical groups
Second British Invasion artists
Live Here Now artists